Many notable restaurants serve Scandinavian cuisine.

Scandinavian